Lake Sherwood, just southeast of Florida State Road 429, is a natural freshwater lake west of Orlando, Florida, in Orange County, Florida. This lake is  surrounded by residential housing and retail establishments. Two roads cross the lake via bridges. Colonial Drive, an east to west street, crosses its middle and Florida State Road 429 cuts across the southern portion of the lake. Much of the lake shore is swampy. Lake Sherwood is listed in the Orange County Wateratlas as a private lake; there is no public access along its shores.

References

Lakes of Orange County, Florida